Nando Bruno Alfred Andre de Colo (born 23 June 1987) is a French professional basketball player for ASVEL of the French LNB Pro A and the EuroLeague. A six-time All-EuroLeague selection, de Colo won the EuroLeague title in 2016 and 2019 with CSKA Moscow, earning both the EuroLeague MVP and Final Four MVP awards in the process.

De Colo is the all-time top scorer in European continental basketball competitions, having surpassed Nikos Galis in 2022.

Early life
De Colo was born in Sainte-Catherine-lès-Arras, France to parents who were both born and raised in Portugal. He attended Lycée Fernand Renaudeau in Cholet, and made his first appearance on the Cholet Under-20 team in 2004–05.

Professional career

Early career
De Colo made his professional debut during the 2006–07 season with Cholet Basket of the LNB Pro A. Under supervision of head coach Erman Kunter, he helped the team win the 2008 Semaine des As (French A Leaders Cup) and reach the finals of the 2008 French Cup and of the 2009 EuroChallenge.

On 1 June 2009, he parted ways with Cholet. On 25 June 2009, he was selected with the 53rd overall pick in the 2009 NBA draft by the San Antonio Spurs.

On 13 July 2009, he signed a three-year deal with Valencia of Spain. He went on to win the 2010 EuroCup title with Valencia.

San Antonio Spurs
On 10 July 2012, De Colo announced he would not be re-signing with Valencia in order to play in the NBA. On 13 July 2012, he signed a two-year deal with the San Antonio Spurs. During his rookie and sophomore seasons, he had multiple assignments with the Austin Toros of the NBA D-League. De Colo reached the 2013 NBA Finals with the Spurs, but the team lost to the Miami Heat in seven games.

Toronto Raptors
On 20 February 2014, De Colo was traded to the Toronto Raptors in exchange for Austin Daye.

CSKA Moscow
On 9 July 2014, De Colo signed a two-year deal (with the third year being optional) with the Russian club CSKA Moscow of the VTB United League. In May 2015, he was chosen to the All-EuroLeague Second Team, for his performances over the season.

In the 2014–15 season, CSKA Moscow managed to advance to the EuroLeague Final Four, for the fourth straight season, after eliminating Panathinaikos for the second straight season in the EuroLeague quarterfinals playoffs series, with a 3–1 series victory. However, in the EuroLeague Final Four's semi-final game, despite being dubbed by the media as an absolute favorite to advance to the Finals, CSKA once again lost to Olympiacos. The final score was 70–68, after a great Olympiacos comeback in the 4th quarter, which was led by Vassilis Spanoulis. CSKA Moscow eventually won the third place game, after defeating Fenerbahçe, by a score of 86–80. In his second EuroLeague season, De Colo averaged a career-high 14.4 points, 3.2 rebounds, and 3.1 assists per game, over 28 games played. On 21 May 2015, De Colo won the VTB United League MVP Award. CSKA Moscow finished the season by winning the VTB United League championship, after eliminating Khimki, with a 3–0 series sweep in the league's finals series.

On 3 May 2016, De Colo was awarded with the Alphonso Ford EuroLeague Top Scorer Trophy, an annual award given to the EuroLeague's top scorer of the season. Nine days later, he was named the EuroLeague MVP. On 15 May, CSKA won the EuroLeague title, and De Colo was named the EuroLeague Final Four MVP.

On 15 June 2016, De Colo signed a new three-year contract with CSKA. He was named the 2016 All-Europe Player of the Year by Eurobasket.com.

In May 2018, he was named the All-EuroLeague First Team for the 2017–18 season. On June 9, 2018, he won his third VTB United League MVP award.

In the 2018–19 season, De Colo won his second EuroLeague title with CSKA after defeating Anadolu Efes in the championship game of the Final Four. Moscow also went on to win the VTB United League once again, making it his fifth league title.

Fenerbahçe
On July 6, 2019, de Colo signed with Fenerbahçe of the Turkish Basketball Super League and the EuroLeague, on a 2+1 deal. On October 19, 2019, de Colo set personal career-high with 39 points in a EuroLeague win over Baskonia. In his first season with the club, he averaged 15.9 points, 3 rebounds and 3 assists over 24 EuroLeague games. The season was cut short due to COVID-19 pandemic.

In 2020–21 season, over 32 EuroLeague games, de Colo averaged 15.8 points, 3.9 assists and 3.2 rebounds per game. In December 2021, he suffered a fracture in the second metacarpal bone of his left hand, which will keep him off the court for weeks after surgery is performed.

ASVEL
On 30 June 2022, De Colo signed a two-year deal with ASVEL of the French LNB Pro A and the EuroLeague. Prior to signing he was also talking with Monaco and Valencia.

On February 5, 2023, De Colo surpassed Nikos Galis as the all-time top scorer in European continental basketball competitions with 4,917 points.

Career statistics

EuroLeague

|-
| style="text-align:left;"| 2010–11
| style="text-align:left;"| Valencia
| 19 || 19 || 21.5 || .335 || .276 || style="background:#CFECEC;"| .957 || 2.6 || 1.6 || 1.4 || .2 || 10.1 || 8.2
|-
| style="text-align:left;"| 2014–15
| style="text-align:left;" rowspan=5| CSKA Moscow
| 28 || 10 || 24.4 || .493 || .471 || .920 || 3.2 || 3.1 || 1.3 || .0 || 14.4 || 16.6
|-
| style="text-align:left;background:#AFE6BA;"| 2015–16†
| 27 || 27 || 27.7 || .526 || .460 || .908 || 3.6 || 5.0 || 1.1 || .1 || style="background:#CFECEC;"| 19.4 || style="background:#CFECEC;"| 24.3
|-
| style="text-align:left;"| 2016–17
| 28 || 23 || 27.1 || .516 || .426 || .959 || 2.9 || 3.9 || 1.0 || .0 || 19.1 || 20.8
|-
| style="text-align:left;"| 2017–18
| 32 || 15 || 27.1 || .542 || .492 || .950 || 2.3 || 3.7 || 1.3 || .1 || 16.7 || 18.9
|-
| style="text-align:left;background:#AFE6BA;"| 2018–19†
| 34 || 24 || 24.3 || .500 || .431 || .946 || 2.5 || 3.4 || .9 || .0 || 14.7 || 16.4
|-
| style="text-align:left;| 2019–20
| style="text-align:left;"| Fenerbahçe
| 24 || 17 || 28.7 || .576 || .400 || .956 || 3.0 || 3.0 || .6 || .0 || 15.9 || 16.5
|- class="sortbottom"
| style="text-align:center;" colspan=2 | Career
| 192 || 135 || 25.8 || .500 || .431 || .940 || 2.8 || 3.5 || 1.1 || .1 || 16.0 || 17.8

NBA

Regular season

|-
| style="text-align:left;" | 
| style="text-align:left;" | San Antonio
| 72 || 6 || 12.8 || .436 || .378 || .795 || 1.9 || 1.9 || .6 || .1 || 3.8
|-
| style="text-align:left;" | 
| style="text-align:left;" | San Antonio
| 26 || 3 || 11.6 || .452 || .323 || .818 || 1.7 || 1.2 || .6 || .1 || 4.3
|-
| style="text-align:left;" | 
| style="text-align:left;" | Toronto
| 21 || 0 || 9.2 || .367 || .364 || 1.000 || 1.3 || 1.6 || .3 || .1 || 3.1
|- class="sortbottom"
| style="text-align:center;" colspan="2"| Career
| 119 || 9 || 11.9 || .429 || .363 || .835 || 1.8 || 1.7 || .5 || .1 || 3.8

Playoffs

|-
| style="text-align:left;" | 2013
| style="text-align:left;" | San Antonio
| 5 || 0 || 2.8 || .250 || .000 || 1.000 || .8 || .4 || .0 || .0 || .8
|-
| style="text-align:left;" | 2014
| style="text-align:left;" | Toronto
| 1 || 0 || 4.0 || .000 || .000 || .000 || 1.0 || .0 || .0 || .0 || .0
|- class="sortbottom"
| style="text-align:center;" colspan="2"| Career
| 6 || 0 || 3.0 || .250 || .000 || 1.000 || .8 || .3 || .0 || .0 || .7

National team career

De Colo is a regular member of the senior men's French national basketball team. He won a silver medal at the EuroBasket 2011 in Lithuania, a gold medal at the EuroBasket 2013 in Slovenia, and a bronze medal at the EuroBasket 2015 in France, where he also earned an All-Tournament Team selection.

De Colo played internationally at the 2012 London Olympics. He played a major role on the French team during the tournament, following the loss of Tony Parker to an injury, prior to the tournament. He also displayed strong offense and defense, as he scored seven points in their game against the United States.

He was the MVP of the 2016 Manila FIBA World Olympic Qualifying Tournament.

International stats

 GP: Games played
 PPG: points per game
 RPG: rebounds per game
 APG: assists per game

See also

References

External links

 
 Nando de Colo at acb.com 
 Nando de Colo at draftexpress.com
 
 Nando de Colo at euroleague.net
 
 Nando de Colo at fiba.com
 Nando de Colo at tblstat.net
 
 
 

1987 births
Living people
2010 FIBA World Championship players
2019 FIBA Basketball World Cup players
ASVEL Basket players
Austin Toros players
Basketball players at the 2012 Summer Olympics
Basketball players at the 2016 Summer Olympics
Basketball players at the 2020 Summer Olympics
Cholet Basket players
Fenerbahçe men's basketball players
FIBA EuroBasket-winning players
French expatriate basketball people in Canada
French expatriate basketball people in Russia
French expatriate basketball people in Spain
French expatriate basketball people in Turkey
French expatriate basketball people in the United States
French men's basketball players
French people of Portuguese descent
Liga ACB players
Medalists at the 2020 Summer Olympics
National Basketball Association players from France
Olympic basketball players of France
Olympic medalists in basketball
Olympic silver medalists for France
PBC CSKA Moscow players
People from Cholet
Point guards
San Antonio Spurs draft picks
San Antonio Spurs players
Shooting guards
Small forwards
Sportspeople from Maine-et-Loire
Sportspeople from Pas-de-Calais
Toronto Raptors players
Valencia Basket players